Sebastian Polter (born 1 April 1991) is a German professional footballer who plays as a striker for Bundesliga club Schalke 04.

Club career

Early career
Polter played for VfL Wolfsburg II from July 2008 until June 2012. During the 2008–09 season, Polter made 10 appearances without scoring a goal. During the 2009–10 season, Polter scored three goals in 15 appearances. During the 2010–11 season, Polter scored 11 goals in 25 appearances. He played for both the first team and reserve team during the 2011–12 season. He scored two goals in 12 appearances for the first team and five goals in 18 appearances for the reserve team.

Polter played for 1. FC Nürnberg between July 2012 and June 2013 and for the reserve team in April 2013. He scored five goals in 27 appearances for the first team and a goal in two appearances for the reserve team.

Polter played for 1. FSV Mainz 05 between July 2013 and August 2014 and 1. FSV Mainz 05 II between September 2013 and June 2014. For the first team, he played in 15 matches without scoring a goal, and for the reserve team, he scored three goals in seven appearances.

In late August 2014, he was loaned to 2. Bundesliga club Union Berlin for the season. He scored 14 goals in 29 appearances.

Queens Park Rangers
In July 2015 it was announced that Queens Park Rangers had signed Polter from FSV Mainz 05 on a three-year-deal for an undisclosed fee. Polter made an instant impact on his debut scoring QPR's third goal in their 10–0 win over Italian side Verona Stars in the club's first pre-season fixture of the summer. Polter's league debut came in a 2–0 away loss to London rivals Charlton Athletic as he came on as a sub for Charlie Austin in the 84th minute. His full debut came in a League Cup match against Yeovil Town, he scored the first goal for QPR as they secured a comfortable 3–0 victory. He finished the 2015–16 season with seven goals in 33 appearances. During the 2016–17 season for Queens Park Rangers, he scored 12 goals in 23 appearances.

Union Berlin
He rejoined Union Berlin on 10 January 2017. During the 2016–17 season for Union Berlin, he scored seven goals in 15 appearances. He finished the 2017–18 season with 12 goals in 26 appearances.

On 28 May 2020, Union Berlin president Dirk Zingler announced in a statement that Polter would not play for the club until the end of his contract in June, stating that Polter was the only member of the club that did not "stand up for each other and for our club," during the COVID-19 pandemic. He had, as the sole member of the first team, refused to take a pay cut as the club was struggling financially due to the effects of the pandemic.

Fortuna Sittard
Polter signed a two-year contract with Dutch Eredivisie club Fortuna Sittard on 17 August 2020.

VfL Bochum
On 13 August 2021, VfL Bochum signed Polter on a free transfer. His contract is until 30th June 2023.

Schalke 04
On 20 June 2022, Polter signed a three-year contract with Schalke 04, which promoted to the Bundesliga.

International career
Polter was a member of several German youth national teams and also appointed to the squad for 2013 UEFA European Under-21 Championship in Israel where Germany were eliminated at the group stage.

Career statistics

References

External links

 Profile at the FC Schalke 04 website
 
 

1991 births
Living people
People from Wilhelmshaven
Footballers from Lower Saxony
German footballers
Germany youth international footballers
Germany under-21 international footballers
Association football forwards
Bundesliga players
2. Bundesliga players
English Football League players
Eredivisie players
SV Wilhelmshaven players
SV Werder Bremen players
Eintracht Braunschweig players
VfL Wolfsburg II players
VfL Wolfsburg players
1. FC Nürnberg players
1. FSV Mainz 05 players
1. FC Union Berlin players
Queens Park Rangers F.C. players
Fortuna Sittard players
VfL Bochum players
FC Schalke 04 players
German expatriate footballers
German expatriate sportspeople in England
Expatriate footballers in England
German expatriate sportspeople in the Netherlands
Expatriate footballers in the Netherlands